Antun Labak (born 14 July 1970) is a Croatian retired professional footballer who played as a striker. He succeeded Josip Milardović as manager of Zrinski Jurjevac in October 2022.

Managerial career
He was assistant to head coach Robert Špehar at Marsonia and later managed Đakovo Croatia. Labak was appointed manager of Vihor Jelisavac in June 2020.

References

External links
 
 Antun Labak at KickersArchiv 
 

1970 births
Living people
People from Osijek-Baranja County
Association football forwards
Croatian footballers
NK Osijek players
Stuttgarter Kickers players
FC Energie Cottbus players
Rot Weiss Ahlen players
SV Eintracht Trier 05 players
Croatian Football League players
Bundesliga players
2. Bundesliga players
Croatian expatriate footballers
Expatriate footballers in Germany
Croatian expatriate sportspeople in Germany
Croatian football managers